Santo Tagliafico, also known as Santino Fortunato Tagliafichi, (1756 - 1829) was an Italian painter, mainly active in Genoa. He trained under Carlo Giuseppe Ratti. He was a member of a prolific family of artists, including father, Nicolò Gaetano (1698-1776) (engineer and scenic designer), and Santo's brothers starting with Andrea (architect); Giuseppe (priest and not artist); Giovanni (architect); Giambattista (engineer and scenic designer); and Domenico (jeweller). Further family members were (Emanuele) Andrea (1729-1812), and Giovanni Andrea. One of Santo's pupils was Gaetano Gallino.

References

1756 births
1829 deaths
18th-century Italian painters
Italian male painters
19th-century Italian painters
Painters from Genoa
19th-century Italian male artists
18th-century Italian male artists